Großenaspe is a municipality in the district of Segeberg in Schleswig-Holstein, Germany.

Geography

Politics
After the 2003 election, the 17 seats of the Großenaspe community council are filled by eleven CDU members, three SPD members, and the remaining three are filled by members from the Green Party and the FDP along with one independent.

References

Segeberg